Enikő Barabás-Mironcic (born 21 July 1986) is a Romanian rower. She competed at the 2008 Summer Olympics, where she won a bronze medal in women's eight. She had previously been on the team that won a silver medal for Romania at the 2005 World Rowing Championships, also in the eight.

Personal life
Mironcic comes from the Hungarian minority in Romania.

References

External links
 JO {Jocurile Olimpice, Olympic Games} 2008: Profil Eniko Barabas. Unirea Urziceni, Lidera In Liga I. 
 
 
 
 

1986 births
Living people
People from Reghin
Romanian female rowers
Olympic bronze medalists for Romania
Olympic rowers of Romania
Rowers at the 2008 Summer Olympics
Rowers at the 2012 Summer Olympics
Romanian sportspeople of Hungarian descent
Olympic medalists in rowing
Medalists at the 2008 Summer Olympics
European Rowing Championships medalists